Kaizer Mabuza (born 1 January 1980) is a South African professional boxer and former IBO super lightweight champion.

Professional career
Kaizer Mabuza made his debut at lightweight and lost by TKO of the first round to future world champion, and fellow country man Isaac Hlatshwayo, who was also making his debut on 15 February 2000.
He went on to win his next 9 fights 4 of them knockout. At a shot of redemption he fought again Isaac Hlatshwayo for 
his South African Lightweight title this time losing a twelve round unanimous decision.
 
Mabuza most recent fight came on 27 February 2010 in an IBF elimination bout against American Kendall Holt. Holt was a heavy favourite to win the fight, but took a severe beating from Mabuza and failed to come out of his corner for the sixth round.

On 5 March 2011 Mabuza lost via 7th round TKO to Zab Judah in a fight for the vacant IBF light welterweight championship.

Professional boxing record (incomplete)

| style="text-align:center;" colspan="8"|25 Wins (15 knockouts), 12 Losses (4 knockouts, 8 decisions)  3 Draws   
|-  style="text-align:center; background:#e3e3e3;"
|  style="border-style:none none solid solid; "|Res.
|  style="border-style:none none solid solid; "|Opponent
|  style="border-style:none none solid solid; "|Type
|  style="border-style:none none solid solid; "|Rd
|  style="border-style:none none solid solid; "|Date
|  style="border-style:none none solid solid; "|Location
|  style="border-style:none none solid solid; "|Notes
|- align=center
|  || align=left| Zolani Marali
| || 12 || 
|align=left|  
|align=left|
|- align=center
|  || align=left| David Avanesyan
| || 12 || 
|align=left|  
|align=left|
|- align=center
|  || align=left| Bethuel Ushona
| || 12 || 
|align=left|  
|align=left|
|- align=center
|  || align=left| Isaac Hlatshwayo
| || 8 || 
|align=left|  
|align=left|
|- align=center
|  || align=left| Khabib Allakhverdiev
| || 4  || 
|align=left|  
|align=left|
|- align=center
|  || align=left| Steven Wills
| || 6  || 
|align=left|  
|align=left|
|- align=center
|  || align=left| Chris van Heerden
| || 12 || 
|align=left|  
|align=left|
|- align=center
|  || align=left| Zab Judah
| || 7  || 
|align=left|  
|align=left|
|- align=center
|  || align=left| Kendall Holt
| || 6  || 
|align=left| 
|align=left|
|- align=center
| || align=left| Serhiy Fedchenko 
| || 12 || 
|align=left| 
|align=left|
|- align=center
| || align=left|  Thulani Mkhwanazi  
| || 3  || 
|align=left| 
|align=left|
|- align=center
| || align=left| Samuel Malinga 
| || 12 || 
|align=left| 
|align=left|
|- align=center
|  || align=left| Jason Naule
| || 3  || 
|align=left| 
|align=left|
|- align=center
| || align=left| Ephraim Swandle  
| ||  2  || 
|align=left| 
|align=left|
|- align=center
| || align=left|  Jason Naule  
| ||  11  || 
|align=left| 
|align=left|
|- align=center
|  || align=left|   Anthony Tshehla  
| || 6 || 
|align=left| 
|align=left|
|- align=center

References 

1980 births
Light-welterweight boxers
Living people
South African male boxers
People from the City of Tshwane Metropolitan Municipality
Sportspeople from Gauteng